Yehliu is a cape in Wanli District, New Taipei, Taiwan.

The cape, known by geologists as the Yehliu Promontory, forms part of the Daliao Miocene Formation. It stretches approximately  into the ocean and was formed as geological forces pushed the Datun Mountains out of the sea.

A distinctive feature of the cape is the hoodoo stones that dot its surface. These shapes can be viewed at the Yehliu Geopark operated by the North Coast and Guanyinshan National Scenic Area administration. A number of rock formations have been given imaginative names based on their shapes. The best known is the "Queen's Head" (女王頭), an iconic image in Taiwan and an unofficial emblem for the town of Wanli. Other formations include the "Fairy Shoe", the "Beehive", the "Ginger Rocks", and the "Sea Candles".

Queen's Head

Queens Head Rock is a natural formation in Yehliu, Taiwan. Named after its resemblance to a woman's head, it took over 4,000 years to form. The popularity of the site draws increasing numbers of international tourists.

Princess' Head
There is a Successor of The Queen's Head- Princess’ Head in the park. The successor is chosen to distract the attention of the Queen's Head and prevent the Queen's Head from being touched by tourists and accelerate the damage.

Since the Queen's Head is fragile, it has been protected by a stone necklace.

See also
 Yehliu Ocean World
List of tourist attractions in Taiwan

References

External links

Taipei County Yehliu Scenic Area Administration
Ocean World, a family attraction in Yehliu

Headlands of Taiwan
Landforms of New Taipei
Tourist attractions in New Taipei
Geoparks in Taiwan